Clifford E. Clinton (August 3, 1900 – November 20, 1969) was a California restaurateur who founded Meals for Millions, one of two parent organizations of Freedom from Hunger, in 1946.

In 1905, Clifford Clinton traveled to China (for the first time) with his missionary parents and 2-3 sisters – they were supported by their restaurant. They returned to California in 1906 to rebuild the restaurant which was destroyed by the San Francisco earthquake and fire. Clifford was too young to remember much about this trip (Donald Clinton, Dec.
2010).

In 1905 the family was forced to escape the warlords by way of a major river (possibly the Yangtze). Their lives were saved by a Buddhist monk, who smuggled them to safety. The monk gifted the family with a figure of Buddha, which is still in the possession of relatives today. (Helen Vallow Williamson, niece, 2013)

1910 – With the family restaurant business again profitable, the Clinton family (except for little Anna, who stayed home with Grandma Hall) returned to China, but this time to south China and the area around Canton. The family worked at a Christian orphanage for the blind. Clifford, age 10, was now able to understand much more about daily life in China – and he was deeply moved by what he saw. His job was to go around each morning to collect the blind baby girls that had been left outdoors to die (girls are considered more expendable than boys) and to bring them back to the orphanage. He also saw the hunger and starvation around him created by the Boxer Rebellion (1898-1900), a time of chaos and disorder in China. With growing banditry, vandalism, and danger in general, the family returned to California in 1912. Clifford made a boyhood vow that if he could ever do anything to help hungry people, he would do it (Donald Clinton, Dec. 2010; Henry Borsook 1979).

Family sources (Helen Vallow Williamson, niece) recall the story of a young blind girl falling into a well. Clifford's eldest brother put himself at risk to save her from drowning, which became an allegory for the love of Christ at the orphanage: that the life of a first-born able-bodied son is no more important than the life of a blind baby girl.

In 1944, Clinton asked Dr. Henry Borsook, a Caltech biochemist, to develop a food supplement that would provide proper nutritional values while costing no more than five cents per meal. Clinton offered $5,000 of his own money to finance the research.  In less than one year, Dr. Borsook and Mme. Soulange Berzceller, a skilled French cook, together developed Multi-Purpose Food (MPF), a high-protein food supplement that could be made for just three cents per meal. This led to the founding of Meals for Millions as a not-for-profit organization in 1946. During the next ten years, 6.5 million pounds of MPF were distributed to relief agencies in 129 countries, including the United States.

Clinton was involved with anti-corruption politics in Los Angeles in the 1930s and ran for mayor in 1945.

Clifford E. Clinton was also owner of a now-defunct cafeteria-style restaurant chain named Clifton's, in Los Angeles, CA.

See also

 Ransom M. Callicott, partner with Clinton
 Meade McClanahan, Los Angeles manufacturer sued by Clinton for criminal libel
 Helen Vallow Williamson is the daughter of Marguerite Vallow, who was Clifford's eldest sister

References

 De Kruif, P. (1945, September). How We Can Help Feed Europe's Hungry. The Reader's Digest, 47(281), 50-52.

External links
 Clifford Clinton biography - SoyInfo Center
 Clifton's Cafeteria Offers Food for Thought
 Chain restaurants: beans and bible verses (Dennett in San Francisco)
 Freedom from Hunger has a history of Meals for Millions
 

1900 births
1969 deaths
Businesspeople from California
American restaurateurs
20th-century American businesspeople
Activists from California
Burials at Forest Lawn Memorial Park (Glendale)
American anti-corruption activists